Two languages have a genetic relationship, and belong to the same language family, if both are descended from a common ancestor, or one is descended from the other.
The term and the process of language evolution are independent of, and not reliant on, the terminology, understanding, and theories related to genetics in the biological sense, so, to avoid confusion, some linguists prefer the term genealogical relationship.

An example of linguistic genetic relationship would be between the Romance languages, such as Spanish, French, and Romanian, all descended from the spoken Latin of ancient Rome.

Language relationships can inform to some extent about possible genetic relationships in the biological sense. For example, if all languages stem from a single origin, it strongly implies that all humanity may have been collected together at some point in history. However, counterexamples exist, such as in the case of adoption and intermixing of specific languages.

Establishing genetic relationships

In some cases such as the Romance example above, wherein Spanish, Italian, Portuguese, Romanian, and French are said to be genetically related to one another as well as to Latin ; and as another example, the related Danish, Swedish and Norwegian, members of the North Germanic language family because of their shared descent from Ancient Norse ; the shared derivation of a group of related languages from a common ancestor is attested in the historical record. In other cases, genetic relationships between languages are established through use of the comparative method of linguistic analysis.

The Romance languages and the North Germanic languages are also related to each other, being subfamilies of the Indo-European language family since both Latin and Old Norse are believed to be descended from an even more ancient language, Proto-Indo-European: therefore, they are genetically related to each other as well.

In order to test the hypothesis that two languages are related, the comparative method begins with the collection of pairs of words that are hypothesized to be cognates: i.e., words in related languages that are derived from the same word in the shared ancestral language. Pairs of words that have similar pronunciations and meanings in the two languages are often good candidates for hypothetical cognates. The researcher must rule out the possibility that the two words are similar merely due to chance, or due to one having borrowed the words from the other (or from a language related to the other). Chance resemblance is ruled out by the existence of large collections of pairs of words between the two languages showing similar patterns of phonetic similarity. Once coincidental similarity and borrowing have been eliminated as possible explanations for similarities in sound and meaning of words, the remaining explanation is common origin: it is inferred that the similarities occurred due to descent from a common ancestor, and the words are actually cognates, implying the languages must be related.

Linguistic interference and borrowing
When languages are in contact with one another, either of them may influence the other through linguistic interference such as borrowing. For example, French has influenced English, Arabic has influenced Persian, Sanskrit has influenced Tamil, and Chinese has influenced Japanese in this way. However, such influence does not constitute (and is not a measure of) a genetic relationship between the languages concerned. Linguistic interference can occur between languages that are genetically closely related, between languages that are distantly related (like English and French, which are distantly related Indo-European languages) and between languages that have no genetic relationship.

Visual representation
A common visual representation of a language family is given by a genetic language tree. The tree model is sometimes termed a dendrogram or phylogeny. The family tree shows the relationship of the languages within in a family, much as a family tree of an individual shows their relationship with their relatives. There are criticisms to the family tree model. Critics focus mainly on the claim that the internal structure of the trees is subject to variation based on the criteria of classification. Even among those who support the family tree model, there are debates over which languages should be included in a language family. For example, within the dubious Altaic language family, there are debates over whether the Japonic and Koreanic languages should be included or not.

The wave model has been proposed as an alternative to the tree model. The wave model uses isoglosses to group language varieties; unlike in the tree model, these groups can overlap. While the tree model implies a lack of contact between languages after derivation from an ancestral form, the wave model emphasizes the relationship between languages that remain in contact, which is more realistic. Historical glottometry is an application of the wave model, meant to identify and evaluate genetic relations in linguistic linkages.

Complications
Some problems encountered by the genetic relationship group of languages include language isolates and mixed, pidgin and creole languages. 

Mixed languages, pidgins and creole languages constitute special genetic types of languages. They do not descend linearly or directly from a single language and have no single ancestor. 

Isolates are languages that cannot be proven to be genealogically related to any other modern language. As a corollary, every language isolate also forms its own language family — a genetic family which happens to consist of just one language. One often cited example is Basque, which forms a language family on its own; but there are many other examples outside Europe. On the global scale, the site Glottolog counts a total of 427 language families in the world, including 182 isolates.

Monogenesis
One controversial theory concerning the genetic relationships among languages is monogenesis, the idea that all known languages, with the exceptions of creoles, pidgins and sign languages, are descendant from a single ancestral language. If that is true, it would mean all languages (other than pidgins, creoles, and sign languages) are genetically related, but in many cases, the relationships may be too remote to be detectable. Alternative explanations for some basic observed commonalities between languages include developmental theories, related to the biological development of the capacity for language as the child grows from newborn.

Links and references

See also
Language family
Comparative linguistics
Language isolate
Sprachbund

Notes

References

Historical linguistics